989 Schwassmannia (prov. designation:  or ) is a stony background asteroid and a slow rotator from the central regions of the asteroid belt, approximately  in diameter. It was discovered on 18 November 1922, by astronomer Friedrich Karl Arnold Schwassmann at the Bergedorf Observatory in Hamburg, Germany. The bright S/T-type asteroid has a long rotation period of 107.9 hours. It was named after the discoverer himself.

Orbit and classification 

Schwassmannia is a non-family asteroid of the main belt's background population when applying the hierarchical clustering method to its proper orbital elements. It orbits the Sun in the central main-belt at a distance of 2.0–3.3 AU once every 4 years and 4 months (1,584 days; semi-major axis of 2.66 AU). Its orbit has an eccentricity of 0.25 and an inclination of 15° with respect to the ecliptic. The body's observation arc begins at the Heidelberg Observatory on 12 November 1922, just 6 days prior to its official discovery observation at the Bergedorf Observatory in Hamburg.

Naming 

This minor planet was named after its discoverer, German astronomer Arnold Schwassmann (1870–1964), who discovered four comets and 22 asteroids in total (including this one). Schwassmann worked at the Potsdam (Berlin) and Hamburg–Bergedorf observatories. The official  was mentioned in The Names of the Minor Planets by Paul Herget in 1955.

Physical characteristics 

In the Tholen- and SMASS-like taxonomy of the Small Solar System Objects Spectroscopic Survey (S3OS2), Schwassmannia is an S-type and T-type asteroid, respectively.

Rotation period 

In November 2013, a rotational lightcurve of Schwassmannia was obtained from photometric observations by astronomers Vladimir Benishek at Sopot Astronomical Observatory , Serbia, American Frederick Pilcher at his Organ Mesa Observatory , New Mexico, and Luis Martinez at Lenomiya Observatory  at Casa Grande in Arizona. Lightcurve analysis gave a well-defined rotation period of  hours with a brightness amplitude of  magnitude. Alternative observations with a lower rated quality by Robert Stephens at the Center for Solar System Studies  in September 2013 gave a period of  hours. The results supersede an earlier, tentative observation by Italian Federico Manzini at the Sozzago Astronomical Station  from October 2004, with an incorrect period 4.5 hours.

Diameter and albedo 

The Collaborative Asteroid Lightcurve Link adopts the result from IRAS, that is, an albedo of 0.2037 and a diameter of 12.86 kilometers based on an absolute magnitude of 11.8.

Notes

References

External links 
 Lightcurve Database Query (LCDB), at www.minorplanet.info
 Dictionary of Minor Planet Names, Google books
 Asteroids and comets rotation curves, CdR – Geneva Observatory, Raoul Behrend
 Discovery Circumstances: Numbered Minor Planets (1)-(5000) – Minor Planet Center
 
 

000989
Discoveries by Friedrich Karl Arnold Schwassmann
Named minor planets
000989
19221118